Justin Karl Freeman is an American academic, teacher, and former nordic skier who represented the United States during the 2006 Winter Olympics. He attended Bates College in Lewiston, Maine where he majored in physics and mathematics, graduating in 1998. He went on to briefly attend the University of Colorado at Boulder for graduate school before being called to compete for the United States Ski Team for the upcoming nationals and olympics in 2006. He now works in Hanover, New Hampshire

See also 
 List of Bates College people

References 

1976 births
Bates College alumni
Cross-country skiers at the 2006 Winter Olympics
American male cross-country skiers
Living people
Olympic cross-country skiers of the United States